

Events

Pre-1600
202 BC – Liu Bang is enthroned as the Emperor of China, beginning four centuries of rule by the Han dynasty.
 870 – The Fourth Council of Constantinople closes.
1525 – Aztec king Cuauhtémoc is executed on the order of conquistador Hernán Cortés.

1601–1900
1638 – The Scottish National Covenant is signed in Edinburgh.
1835 – Elias Lönnrot signed and dated the first version of the Kalevala, the so-called foreword to the Old Kalevala.
1844 – A gun explodes on board the steam warship USS Princeton during a pleasure cruise down the Potomac River, killing six, including Secretary of State Abel Upshur. President John Tyler, who was also on board, was not injured from the blast.

1901–present
1922 – The United Kingdom ends its protectorate over Egypt through a Unilateral Declaration of Independence.
1925 – The Charlevoix-Kamouraska earthquake strikes northeastern North America.
1947 – February 28 Incident: In Taiwan, civil disorder is put down with the loss of an estimated 30,000 civilians.
1948 – Christiansborg Cross-Roads shooting in the Gold Coast, when a British police officer opens fire on a march of ex-servicemen, killing three of them and sparking major riots and looting in Accra.
1953 – James Watson and Francis Crick announce to friends that they have determined the chemical structure of DNA; the formal announcement takes place on April 25 following publication in April's Nature (pub. April 2).
1958 – A school bus in Floyd County, Kentucky hits a wrecker truck and plunges down an embankment into the rain-swollen Levisa Fork river. The driver and 26 children die in what remains one of the worst school bus accidents in U.S. history.
1959 – Discoverer 1, an American spy satellite that is the first object intended to achieve a polar orbit, is launched but fails to achieve orbit.
1966 – A NASA T-38 Talon crashes into the McDonnell Aircraft factory while attempting a poor-visibility landing at Lambert Field, St. Louis, killing astronauts Elliot See and Charles Bassett.
1972 – China–United States relations: The United States and China sign the Shanghai Communiqué.
1974 – The British election ended in a hung parliament after the Jeremy Thorpe-led Liberal Party achieved their biggest vote.
1975 – In London, an underground train fails to stop at Moorgate terminus station and crashes into the end of the tunnel, killing 43 people.
1980 – Andalusia approves its statute of autonomy through a referendum.
1983 – The final episode of M*A*S*H airs, with almost 106 million viewers. It still holds the record for the highest viewership of a season finale.
1985 – The Provisional Irish Republican Army carries out a mortar attack on the Royal Ulster Constabulary police station at Newry, killing nine officers in the highest loss of life for the RUC on a single day.
1986 – Olof Palme, 26th Prime Minister of Sweden, is assassinated in Stockholm.
1991 – The first Gulf War ends.
1993 – The Bureau of Alcohol, Tobacco and Firearms agents raid the Branch Davidian church in Waco, Texas with a warrant to arrest the group's leader David Koresh. Four ATF agents and six Davidians die in the initial raid, starting a 51-day standoff.
1995 – Former Australian Liberal party leader John Hewson resigns from the Australian parliament almost two years after losing the 1993 Australian federal election.
1997 – An earthquake in northern Iran is responsible for about 3,000 deaths.
  1997   – GRB 970228, a highly luminous flash of gamma rays, strikes the Earth for 80 seconds, providing early evidence that gamma-ray bursts occur well beyond the Milky Way.
  1997   – A Turkish military memorandum resulted with collapse of the government in Turkey.
2001 – The 2001 Nisqually earthquake, having a moment magnitude of 6.8, with epicenter in the southern Puget Sound, damages Seattle metropolitan area.
2002 – During the religious violence in Gujarat, 97 people are killed in the Naroda Patiya massacre and 69 in the Gulbarg Society massacre.
2005 – A suicide bombing at a police recruiting centre in Al Hillah, Iraq kills 127.
2013 – Pope Benedict XVI resigns as the pope of the Catholic Church, becoming the first pope to do so since Pope Gregory XII, in 1415.
2023 – Two trains collide south of the Vale of Tempe in Greece, leading to the deaths of at least 57 people and leaving 58 missing and 85 injured.

Births

Pre-1600
1261 – Margaret of Scotland, Queen of Norway (d. 1283)
1518 – Francis III, Duke of Brittany, Duke of Brittany (d. 1536)
1533 – Michel de Montaigne, French philosopher and author (d. 1592)
1535 – Cornelius Gemma, Dutch astronomer and astrologer (d. 1578)
1552 – Jost Bürgi, Swiss mathematician and clockmaker (d. 1632)

1601–1900
1675 – Guillaume Delisle, French cartographer (d. 1726)
1683 – René Antoine Ferchault de Réaumur, French entomologist and academic (d. 1757)
1704 – Louis Godin, French astronomer and academic (d. 1760)
1848 – Arthur Giry, French historian and academic (d. 1899)
1858 – Tore Svennberg, Swedish actor and director (d. 1941)
1866 – Vyacheslav Ivanov, Russian poet and playwright (d. 1949) 
1878 – Pierre Fatou, French mathematician and astronomer (d. 1929)
1884 – Ants Piip, Estonian lawyer and politician, 7th Prime Minister of Estonia (d. 1942)
1887 – William Zorach, Lithuanian-American sculptor and painter (d. 1966)
1894 – Ben Hecht, American director, producer, and screenwriter (d. 1964)
1896 – Philip Showalter Hench, American physician and endocrinologist, Nobel Prize laureate (d. 1965)
1898 – Zeki Rıza Sporel, Turkish footballer (d. 1969)

1901–present
1901 – Linus Pauling, American chemist and activist, Nobel Prize laureate (d. 1994)
1906 – Bugsy Siegel, American gangster (d. 1947)
1907 – Milton Caniff, American cartoonist (d. 1988)
1908 – Billie Bird, American actress (d. 2002)
1909 – Stephen Spender, English author and poet (d. 1995)
1915 – Ketti Frings, American author, playwright, and screenwriter (d. 1981)
  1915   – Peter Medawar, Brazilian-English biologist and immunologist, Nobel Prize laureate (d. 1987)
1919 – Alfred Marshall, American businessman, founded Marshalls (d. 2013)
1920 – Jadwiga Piłsudska, Polish soldier, pilot, and architect (d. 2014)
1921 – Marah Halim Harahap, Indonesian military officer, Governor of North Sumatra (d. 2015)
1922 – Radu Câmpeanu, Romanian politician (d. 2016)
1924 – Robert A. Roe, American soldier and politician (d. 2014)
1925 – Harry H. Corbett, Burmese-English actor (d. 1982)
1928 – Stanley Baker, Welsh actor and producer (d. 1976)
  1928   – Tom Aldredge, American actor (d. 2011)
  1928   – Sylvia del Villard, actress, dancer, choreographer and Afro-Puerto Rican activist (d. 1990)
1929 – Hayden Fry, American football player and coach (d. 2019)
  1929   – John Montague, American-Irish poet and academic (d. 2016)
  1929   – Frank Gehry, Canadian-born American architect and designer
1930 – Leon Cooper, American physicist and academic, Nobel Prize laureate
1931 – Peter Alliss, English golfer and sportscaster (d. 2020)
1931 – Gavin MacLeod, American actor, Christian activist, and author (d. 2021)
  1931   – Len Newcombe, Welsh footballer and scout (d. 1996)
1932 – Don Francks, Canadian actor, singer, and jazz musician (d. 2016)
1933 – Rein Taagepera, Estonian political scientist and politician
1937 – Jeff Farrell, American swimmer
1939 – Daniel C. Tsui, Chinese-American physicist and academic, Nobel Prize laureate
  1939   – Tommy Tune, American actor, dancer, singer, theatre director, producer, and choreographer
1940 – Mario Andretti, Italian-American racing driver
1942 – Frank Bonner, American actor and television director (d. 2021)
  1942   – Brian Jones, English guitarist, songwriter, and producer (d. 1969)
  1942   – Dino Zoff, Italian footballer
1943 – Barbara Acklin, American singer-songwriter (d. 1998)
1944 – Kelly Bishop, American actress
  1944   – Edward Greenspan, Canadian lawyer and author (d. 2014)
  1944   – Sepp Maier, German footballer and manager
  1944   – Storm Thorgerson, English graphic designer (d. 2013)
1945 – Bubba Smith, American football player and actor (d. 2011)
1946 – Robin Cook, Scottish educator and politician, Secretary of State for Foreign and Commonwealth Affairs (d. 2005)
  1946   – Syreeta Wright, American singer-songwriter (d. 2004)
1948 – Steven Chu, American physicist and politician, 12th United States Secretary of Energy, Nobel Prize laureate
  1948   – Bernadette Peters, American actress, singer, and author
  1948   – Mercedes Ruehl, American actress
1949 – Zoia Ceaușescu, Romanian mathematician, daughter of Communist leader Nicolae Ceaușescu and his wife Elena Ceaușescu (d. 2006)
1953 – Paul Krugman, American economist and academic, Nobel Prize laureate
  1953   – Ricky Steamboat, American professional wrestler
1954 – Brian Billick, American football player, coach, and sportscaster
1955 – Adrian Dantley, American basketball player and coach
  1955   – Gilbert Gottfried, American comedian, actor, and singer (d. 2022)
  1956   – Francis Hughes, Irish Republican, hunger striker (d. 1981)
1956 – Terry Leahy, English businessman
1957 – Ian Smith, New Zealand cricketer and sportscaster
  1957   – John Turturro, American actor and director
  1957   – Cindy Wilson, American singer-songwriter
1958 – Manuel Torres Félix, Mexican criminal and narcotics trafficker (d. 2012)
  1958   – David R. Ross, Scottish historian and author (d. 2010)
1961 – Barry McGuigan, Irish-British boxer
1963 – Claudio Chiappucci, Italian cyclist
1966 – Paulo Futre, Portuguese footballer
  1966   – Archbishop Jovan VI of Ohrid
1967 – Colin Cooper, English footballer and manager
  1967   – Seth Rudetsky, American musician, actor, writer, and radio host
1969 – Sean Farrel, English footballer
  1969   – Butch Leitzinger, American race car driver
  1969   – Robert Sean Leonard, American actor
  1969   –  Pat Monahan, American singer, songwriter and actor
1970 – Noureddine Morceli, Algerian runner
  1970   – Daniel Brochu, Canadian actor
1971 – Junya Nakano, Japanese pianist and composer
1972 – Ville Haapasalo, Finnish actor and screenwriter
1973 – Eric Lindros, Canadian ice hockey player
  1973   – Scott McLeod, New Zealand rugby player
  1973   – Nicolas Minassian, French race car driver
  1973   – Masato Tanaka, Japanese wrestler
1974 – Lee Carsley, English-Irish footballer and manager
  1974   – Alexander Zickler, German footballer and manager
1975 – Mike Rucker, American football player
1976 – Ali Larter, American actress and model
1977 – Jason Aldean, American singer-songwriter
  1977   – Lance Hoyt, American football player and wrestler
1978 – Benjamin Raich, Austrian skier
  1978   – Jamaal Tinsley, American basketball player
  1978   – Mariano Zabaleta, Argentinian tennis player
1979 – Sébastien Bourdais, French race car driver
  1979   – Ivo Karlović, Croatian tennis player
1980 – Pascal Bosschaart, Dutch footballer
  1980   – Christian Poulsen, Danish footballer
  1980   – Tayshaun Prince, American basketball player
1981 – Brian Bannister, American baseball player and scout
1982 – Natalia Vodianova, Russian-French model and actress
1984 – Karolína Kurková, Czech model and actress
1985 – Tim Bresnan, English cricketer
  1985   – Jelena Janković, Serbian tennis player
  1985   – Diego Ribas da Cunha, Brazilian footballer
1987 – Antonio Candreva, Italian footballer
1988 – Aroldis Chapman, Cuban baseball player
1989 – Carlos Dunlap, American football player
  1989   – Charles Jenkins, American basketball player
  1989   – Kevin Proctor, New Zealand rugby league player
1990 – Takayasu Akira, Japanese sumo wrestler
1994 – Arkadiusz Milik, Polish footballer
1999 – Luka Dončić, Slovenian basketball player
2000 – Moise Kean, Italian footballer

Deaths

Pre-1600
 628 – Khosrow II, Shah of Iran, Sasanian Empire (b. )

1601–1900
1621 – Cosimo II de' Medici, Grand Duke of Tuscany (b. 1590)
1740 – Pietro Ottoboni, Italian cardinal and patron of the arts (b.  1667)
1857 – André Dumont, Belgian geologist and academic (b.  1809)
1882 – Adolf Zytogorski, Polish-British chess master and translator (b. )

1901–present
1929 – Clemens von Pirquet, Austrian physician and immunologist (b.  1874)
1932 – Guillaume Bigourdan, French astronomer and academic (b.  1851)
1936 – Charles Nicolle, French biologist and academic, Nobel Prize laureate (b.  1866)
1966 – Charles Bassett, American captain, engineer, and astronaut (b.  1931)
  1966   – Elliot See, American commander, engineer, and astronaut (b.  1927)
1975 – Neville Cardus,  English cricket and music writer (b. 1888)
1977 – Eddie "Rochester" Anderson, American actor and comedian (b.  1905) 
1978 – Zara Cully, American actress (b.  1892)
  1993   – Ruby Keeler, Canadian-American actress and dancer (b.  1909)
1998 – Arkady Shevchenko, Ukrainian diplomat (b.  1930)
2002 – Mary Stuart, American actress and singer (b.  1926)
  2002   – Helmut Zacharias, German violinist and composer (b.  1920)
2003 – Chris Brasher, Guyanese-English runner and journalist, co-founded the London Marathon (b.  1928)
2004 – Daniel J. Boorstin, American historian and librarian (b.  1914)
2005 – Chris Curtis, English singer and drummer (b.  1941)
2006 – Owen Chamberlain, American physicist and academic, Nobel Prize laureate (b.  1920)
  2007   – Arthur M. Schlesinger, Jr. American historian and critic (b.  1917)
2009 – Paul Harvey, American radio host (b.  1918)
2011 – Annie Girardot, French actress (b.  1931)
2013 – Donald A. Glaser, American physicist and biologist, Nobel Prize laureate (b.  1926)
2014 – Hugo Brandt Corstius, Dutch linguist and author (b.  1935)
2015 – Yaşar Kemal, Turkish journalist and author (b.  1923)
2016 – George Kennedy, American actor (b.  1925)
2017 – Pierre Pascau, Mauritian-Canadian journalist (b.  1938)
2019 – André Previn, German-American pianist, conductor, and composer. (b.  1929)
2020 – Joe Coulombe, founder of Trader Joe's (b.  1930)
  2020   – Freeman Dyson, British-born American physicist and mathematician (b.  1923)
  2020   – Sir Lenox Hewitt, Australian public servant (b.  1917)

Holidays and observances
Christian feast day:
February 28 (Eastern Orthodox liturgics)
Kalevala Day, also known as the Finnish Culture Day (Finland)
National Science Day (India)

References

External links

 BBC: On This Day
 
 Historical Events on February 28

Days of the year
February